Csernovics Ujfalu was puszta (in Hungarian) or praedium (depopulated area, in Latin) in the NW part of Arad County, about 10–15 km from the Romanian-Hungarian border, via Curtici. Situated SE of Curtici, it was depopulated in March 1852, when the new landlord (who presumably won the property playing a cards game) dissolved the property, ousting the farmers working there on tobacco fields. The farmers were originally from the Nógrád county, in northern Hungary and they settled in Arad County, on the Zimand puszta, today Zimandu Nou, Arad, next to the previously founded village of Zimandköz. The latter was formed in 1853 by 92 families of Hungarian Roman Catholic farmers ousted by their landlord from Bánkuta puszta, in the western part of Arad county (Elek jaras/district, now in Hungary). Today the only remaining part of this settlement is the Csernovics Castle, nearby Macea, Arad.

See also 
 List of castles in Romania
 Tourism in Romania

References

Geography of Arad County